Baptism of Christ is an oil on panel painting by Parmigianino, executed c. 1519, the earliest surviving work by the artist, produced when he was only sixteen. It is now in the Gemäldegalerie in Berlin. 

It is usually identified with an anecdote in Vasari's Lives of the Artists:

Bibliography (in Italian)
 Luisa Viola, Parmigianino, Parma, 2007 
 Mario Di Giampaolo ed Elisabetta Fadda, Parmigianino, Keybook, Santarcangelo di Romagna 2002.

References

1519 paintings
Paintings in the Gemäldegalerie, Berlin
Paintings by Parmigianino
Parmigianino